Flowery Branch High School is a four-year public high school located in Flowery Branch, Georgia, United States, operated by Hall County Schools. The school serves the communities of Flowery Branch, Buford, and part of Braselton.  In 2007, Flowery Branch was voted Georgia's High School of Excellence. It is one of seven high schools in the district and enrolls about 1,600 students.

History 
A previous school named Flowery Branch High School burned down in 1943. Afterwards, students continued their education at neighboring schools. Many years later in 2002, Hall County Schools added two new high schools, a new Flowery Branch High School and Chestatee High School in the northern part of the county. FBHS was opened on Hog Mountain Road to relieve neighboring Johnson High School and West Hall High School.

Hall County experienced a 29% growth rate over the period of 2000 to 2010. The Flowery Branch High School had a 44.58% growth rate over this same time.

In 2012, Flowery Branch High School received a charter from the Georgia Department of Education, which allowed for a Global Studies and Leadership Academy.  The school dissolved the charter and began a STEAM program of choice in 2017.

Extracurricular activities

Music 
The Flowery Branch High School band program is presently under the direction of Dennis L. Naughton. The program consists of two concert bands, marching band, jazz band, Winter guard and previously, indoor drumline, all of which have received consistent superior ratings since the introduction of Naughton to the program. The marching band is regionally known for its outstanding drumline and front ensemble which regularly receive high recognition in competition. Prior to the beginning of the 2019-2020 school year, director Dennis Naughton announced his retirement. Later that year, it was announced that Mr. Miguel Guisasola would take over as director of bands.

Athletics 
Flowery Branch is a member of the Georgia High School Association (GHSA) in Class AAAA Region 7.

Football 
The Flowery Branch Falcons football team has developed into state contenders. Head coach Lee Shaw built the program from the ground up, going from an inaugural 0-10 season in 2002 to a state finals appearance in 2008.  After three years with a combined record of 6-24, Shaw and the Falcons broke through in 2005 with an 11-2 record and a trip to the Elite 8.  The Falcons have achieved four straight playoff appearances with a 52-14 combined record.

During the 2008 postseason, Flowery Branch adopted the name "Road Warriors," traveling over 900 miles throughout the playoffs en route to a berth in the Class AAA state championship. Due to the school's move to a new building the year prior and the expanding size of the student body, 2010 saw the Falcons move into the AAAA classification for football, and put an end to the Falcons' rivalries with nearby North Hall, Gainesville, and Chestatee. In 2011, after the season was over, Coach Lee Shaw resigned to go back to Rabun County and put former defensive coordinator Chris Griffin as coach. After five years as head coach and a 29-23 record coach, Griffin resigned as head coach. In 2017, Griffin was replaced by Ben Hall, former head coach of Jefferson High School and former offensive line of Flowery Branch.

Notable seasons 
 2009 (10-4) Region 4th Place: Class AAA Final 4
 2008 (12-3) Region 3rd Place: Class AAA State Championship - State Runner-Up
 2007 (9-2)  Region Runner-Up: Class AAA Playoffs
 2006 (10-2) Region Runner-Up: Class AAA Sweet 16
 2005 (11-2) Region Runner-Up: Class AAA Elite 8
 2011 (11-2) Region Runner-Up : Class AAAA Quarter finals
 2012 (8-3) Region Champions: Class AAAAA First Round

Notable alumni 
 Brad Keller, Major League  Baseball pitcher
 Connor Shaw (2010), former starting quarterback for the University of South Carolina Gamecocks football team

References

External links 
 Flowery Branch High School
 Hall County Board of Education

Educational institutions established in 2002
Schools in Hall County, Georgia
Public high schools in Georgia (U.S. state)
2002 establishments in Georgia (U.S. state)